R. Jeffrey Orr is a Canadian businessman and is the president and chief executive of Power Corporation of Canada.

Background
Orr holds a Bachelor of Arts — Honours Business Administration degree from the Richard Ivey Business School in London, Ontario.

Career
Orr was appointed president and chief executive officer of Power Corporation of Canada in February 2020.

He has been president and chief executive officer of Power Financial since 2005. From 2001 to 2005, he was president and chief executive officer of IGM Financial.

Prior to joining IGM Financial, he was chairman and chief executive officer of BMO Nesbitt Burns and vice-chair, Investment Banking Group, Bank of Montreal. He had been with BMO Nesbitt Burns and predecessor companies since 1981.

Jeffrey Orr has been recognized as one of Canada's most powerful business people in 2015 by the Canadian Business. At that time, he was overseeing $373 billion in assets.

Board Memberships
He serves as a director of:
 Power Corporation of Canada and Power Financial
 Great-West Lifeco (chairman)
 Canada Life (chairman)
 Empower Retirement (chairman)
 Putnam Investments (chairman)
 IGM Financial (chairman)
 IG Wealth Management (chairman)
 Mackenzie (chairman)
 PanAgora Asset Management

Orr is a Member of the Business Council of Canada.

Honors and awards
 Orr received the 2015 Ivey Business Leader Award from the Richard Ivey School of Business in London, Ontario.

Philanthropy
Orr has been supporting the Canadian Red Cross as an Honorary committee member from 2016 to 2019.

He is a member of the council of governors of Centraide of Greater Montreal.

References

Canadian businesspeople